Andrian Mardiansyah (born 14 November 1978) is an Indonesian football player and manager who previously plays as midfielder for Persikota Tangerang, Persija Jakarta, Persib Bandung, Deltras Sidoarjo, PSIS Semarang, Persikabo Bogor, Persiba Balikpapan, Persidafon Dafonsoro and the Indonesia national team.

Club statistics

International career
He received his first international cap on 31 July 1999 and retired from the Indonesia national football team in 1999, appearing in 5 matches. Andrian scored the first goal for Indonesia in the 1999 Southeast Asian Games football tournament against Cambodia.

International goals
|}

Hounors

Clubs
Persija Jakarta :
Liga Indonesia Premier Division champions : 1 (2001)

References

1978 births
Association football midfielders
Living people
Indonesian footballers
Indonesia international footballers
Persikota Tangerang players
Persija Jakarta players
Persib Bandung players
Deltras F.C. players
PSIS Semarang players
Persikabo Bogor players
Persiba Balikpapan players
Persidafon Dafonsoro players
Indonesian Premier Division players
Southeast Asian Games bronze medalists for Indonesia
Southeast Asian Games medalists in football
Competitors at the 1999 Southeast Asian Games
People from Bogor
Sportspeople from West Java